If then may refer to:

 if-then, a construct in computer programming
 If/Then, a 2014 musical
 "If/Then", an episode in season 8 of Grey's Anatomy

See also
 "If-Then-Else", an episode of Person of Interest
 If Then Else, a 2000 album by The Gathering
 Conditional (disambiguation)